Ekibulak is a rural locality (a selo) in Erpelinsky Selsoviet, Buynaksky District, Republic of Dagestan, Russia. The population was 114 as of 2010.

Geography 
Ekibulak is located 33 km north of Buynaksk (the district's administrative centre) by road. Novaya Urada and Uchkent are the nearest rural localities.

References 

Rural localities in Buynaksky District